Tenbury High Ormiston Academy (formerly Tenbury High School) is a coeducational secondary school with academy status located in Tenbury Wells in the English county of Worcestershire. In 2005 it was awarded specialist science and mathematics status.

Previously a community school administered by Worcestershire County Council, Tenbury High School converted to academy status on 1 September 2014 and was renamed Tenbury High Ormiston Academy. The school is now sponsored by the Ormiston Academies Trust but continues to coordinate with Worcestershire County Council for admissions.

Senior management

The post of Executive Principal at the academy is shared with Ormiston Forge Academy in Cradley Heath. As of 2020, the postholder is Andrew Burns.

Headteachers
 1998-2013: Stuart Cooke
 2013-2018: Adrian Price
 2018–present (as of 2021): Victoria Dean

References

https://www.worcesternews.co.uk/news/7460414.schools-celebrate-specialist-status-awards/

External links
Tenbury High Ormiston Academy official website

Secondary schools in Worcestershire
Academies in Worcestershire
Ormiston Academies
Tenbury Wells